

Αα
(h)a

Ageōmétrētos mēdeìs eisítō.
"Let no one untrained in geometry enter."
Motto over the entrance to Plato's Academy (quoted in Elias' commentary on Aristotle's Categories: Eliae in Porphyrii Isagogen et Aristotelis categorias commentaria, CAG XVIII.1, Berlin 1900, p. 118.13–19).

Aeì Libýē phérei ti kainón.
"Libya always bears something new", Aristotle, Historia Animalium.
Compare Latin Ex Africa semper aliquid novi "From Africa always something new", Pliny.

Aeì koloiòs parà koloiôi hizánei.
"A jackdaw is always found near a jackdaw"
Similar to English "birds of a feather flock together."

Aei ho theos geōmetreî.
"God always geometrizes" — Plato
Plutarch elaborated on this phrase in his essay Πῶς Πλάτων ἔλεγε τὸν θεὸν ἀεί γεωμετρεῖν "What is Plato’s meaning when he says that God always applies geometry". Based on the  phrase of Plato, above, a present-day mnemonic for π (pi) was derived:

Aeì ho theòs ho mégas geōmetreî tò sýmpan. 
 Always the great God applies geometry to the universe

Aetoû gêras, korydoû neótēs.
"An eagle's old age (is worth) a sparrow's youth".

aièn aristeúein
“Ever to Excel“
Motto of the University of St Andrews (founded 1410), the Edinburgh Academy (founded 1824), and Boston College (founded 1863). The source is the sixth book of Homer's Iliad, (Iliad 6. 208) in a speech Glaucus delivers to Diomedes:
"Hippolocus begat me. I claim to be his son, and he sent me to Troy with strict instructions: Ever to excel, to do better than others, and to bring glory to your forebears, who indeed were very great ... This is my ancestry; this is the blood I am proud to inherit."

aika.
"If."
Plutarch reports that Philip II of Macedon sent word to the Spartans, saying that "if I should invade Laconia, I shall drive you out" (ἂν ἐμβάλω εἰς τὴν Λακωνικήν, ἀναστάτους ὑμᾶς ποιήσω). The Spartans laconically responded with "if."

Anánkāi d'oudè theoì mákhontai.
"Not even the gods fight necessity" — Simonides, 8, 20.

 
allá ti ēi moi taúta perí drun ē perí pétrēn.
"But why all this about oak or stone?"
English : Why waste time on trivial subjects, or "Why make a mountain out of a mole hill?"
Hesiod, Theogony, 35.

Andrôn gàr epiphanôn pâsa gê táphos.
For illustrious men have the whole earth for their tomb. Pericles' Funeral Oration from Thucydides, History of the Peloponnesian War 2.43.3

Anerrhíphthō kýbos.
Alea iacta est.
Latin: "The die has been cast"; Greek: "Let the die be cast."
Julius Caesar as reported by Plutarch, when he entered Italy with his army in 49 BC. Translated into Latin by Suetonius as alea iacta est.

Ánthrōpos métron.
"Man [is] the measure [of all things]"
Motto of Protagoras (as quoted in Plato's Theaetetus 152a).

Hápax legómenon.
"Once said"
A word that only occurs once.

Apò mēkhanês Theós
Deus ex machina
"God from the machine"
The phrase originates from the way deity figures appeared in ancient Greek theaters, held high up by a machine, to solve a problem in the plot.

Apò toû hēlíou metástēthi
"Stand a little out of my sun"
Legendary reply of Diogenes the Cynic when Alexander the Great asked him if he had any wish he desired to fulfil — version recounted by Plutarch

Áriston mèn hýdōr.
"Greatest however [is] water" — Pindar, Olymp. 1, 1
Used as the inscription over the Pump Room at Bath.

autòs épha
Ipse dixit
"He himself said it"
Argument from authority made by the disciples of Pythagoras when appealing to the pronouncements of the master rather than to reason or evidence. The Latin translation of the phrase comes from Marcus Tullius Cicero in De Natura Deorum (On the Nature of the Gods)

Ββ 
b

Basileía tôn ouranôn
"kingdom of the heavens"
"Heaven" is a foundational theological concept in Christianity and Judaism.
"God's Kingdom" (Βασιλεία τοῦ Θεοῦ, Basileia tou Theou), or the "Kingdom of [the] Heaven[s]" was the main point of Jesus Christ's preaching on earth. The phrase occurs more than a hundred times in the New Testament.

Bellerophóntēs tà grámmata
"Bellerophontic letter"
King Proetus dared not to kill a guest, so he sent Bellerophon to King Iobates, his father-in-law, bearing a sealed message in a folded tablet: "Pray remove the bearer from this world: he attempted to violate my wife, your daughter."

Brôma theôn
"Food of the gods"
Allegedly said by Nero of the poisoned mushrooms with which his mother Agrippina the Younger murdered Claudius.

Γγ 
g

Gēraskō d' aíeí pollâ didaskómenos.
"I grow old always learning many things."
Solon the Athenian, one of the seven Sages of Greece, on learning.

Glaûk’ Athḗnaze / eis Athḗnas
"Owls (Athenian drachmas) to Athens" — Aristophanes, The Birds, 302, also in 1106
E.g., coals to Newcastle, ice to the Eskimos.

Gnôthi seautón.
"Know thyself"
Aphorism inscribed over the entrance to the temple of Apollo at Delphi.

Górdios desmós
"Gordian Knot"
The Gordian Knot is a legend associated with Alexander the Great. It is often used as a metaphor for an intractable problem, solved by a bold stroke

Δδ 
d

Deîmos kaì Phóbos
"Horror and Fear"
Deimos and Phobos, the moons of Mars, are named after the sons of the Greek god Ares (Roman Mars): Deimos "horror" and Phobos "fear".

Déspota, mémneo tôn Athēnaíōn.
"Master, remember the Athenians."
When Darius was informed that Sardis had been captured and burnt by the Athenians he was furious. He placed an arrow on his bow and shot it into the sky, praying to the deities to grant him vengeance on the Athenians. He then ordered one of his servants to say three times a day the above phrase in order to remind him that he should punish the Athenians.

Diaírei kaì basíleue.
"Divide and rule."

Diploûn horôsin hoi mathóntes grámmata.
"Those who know the letters see double [twice as much as those who don't]."
Attributed to Pythagoras. — Inscription in Edinburgh from 1954: 
Δ

Dôs moi pâ stô, kaì tàn gân kīnā́sō.
"Give me somewhere to stand, and I will move the earth".
Archimedes as quoted by Pappus of Alexandria, Synagoge, Book VIII.

Εε
(h)e

Ean ēis philomathēs, esei polymathēs
"If you are fond of learning, you will soon be full of learning"
 Isocrates, To Demonicus 18

Heîs oiōnòs áristos, amýnesthai perì pátrēs
"There is only one omen, to fight for one's country"
The Trojan prince Hector to his friend and lieutenant Polydamas when the latter was superstitious about a bird omen. The omen was an eagle that flew with a snake in its talons, still alive and struggling to escape. The snake twisted backward until it struck the bird on the neck, forcing the eagle to let the snake fall.

Ek tôn hôn ouk áneu
Sine qua non
"Without things which [one can]not [be] without"

Hellḗnōn promachoûntes Athēnaîoi Marathôni chrysophórōn Mḗdōn estóresan dýnamin
Fighting in the forefront of the Hellenes, the Athenians at Marathon brought low the Medes' gilded power.
Epigram by Simonides on the tomb of the Athenians who died in the Battle of Marathon.

Hèn oîda hóti oudèn oîda
"I know one thing, that I know nothing"
Socrates, paraphrased from Plato's Apology.

Enthen mén Skýllē, hetérōthi de dîa Charubdis
"On one side lay Scylla and on the other divine Charybdis" 
Odysseus was forced to choose between Scylla and Charybdis, two mythical sea monsters, an expression commonly known as Between Scylla and Charybdis.

Epeì d' oûn pántes hósoi te peripoloûsin phanerôs kaì hósoi phaínontai kath' hóson àn ethélōsin theoì génesin éskhon, légei pròs autoùs ho tóde tò pân gennḗsas táde
"When all of them, those gods who appear in their revolutions, as well as those other gods who appear at will had come into being, the creator of the universe addressed them the following" — Plato, Timaeus, 41a, on gods and the creator of the universe.

Heúrēka!
"I have found [it]!"
While Archimedes was taking a bath, he noticed that the level of the water rose as he got in, and he realized that the volume of water displaced must be equal to the volume of the part of his body he had submerged. This meant that the volume of irregular objects could be measured with precision, a previously intractable problem. He was so excited that he ran through the streets naked and still wet from his bath, crying "I have found it!".

Ζζ 

Zôion dípoun ápteron
"two-legged featherless animal"
Plato's definition of humans, latinized as "Animal bipes implume"
To criticize this definition, Diogenes the Cynic plucked a chicken and brought it into Plato's Academy saying:

Oûtós estin o Plátōnos ánthrōpos
"Here is Plato's man."
In response, Plato added to his definition:

Platyṓnychon
"Having broad nails"
As quoted by Diogenes Laërtius, Lives of Eminent Philosophers

Zôion politikòn
"Man is by nature a political animal", i.e. animal of the polis or social being
Aristotle, Politics, book 1:

Ηη
(h)ē

Ḕ tā̀n ḕ epì tâs
"Either [with] it [your shield], or on it"
Meaning "either you will win the battle, or you will die and then be carried back home on your shield; but you will not throw your shield away to flee."
It was said by Spartan mothers to their sons before they went out to battle to remind them of their bravery and duty to Sparta and Greece.  
A hoplite could not escape the field of battle unless he tossed away the heavy and cumbersome shield. Therefore, "losing one's shield" meant desertion. (Plutarch, Moralia, 241)

Hē phýsis oudèn poieî hálmata.
Natura non facit saltus.
"Nature does not make [sudden] jumps."
A principle of natural philosophies since Aristotle's time, the exact phrase coming from Carl von Linné.

Êlthon, eîdon, eníkēsa.
Veni, vidi, vici.
"I came, I saw, I conquered."
With these words, Julius Caesar described his victory against Pharnaces, according to Plutarch.

Θθ
th

Thálassa kaì pŷr kaì gynḗ, kakà tría.
"Sea and fire and woman, three evils."

Thálatta, thálatta.
“The Sea! The Sea!“
Thalatta! Thalatta! from Xenophon's Anabasis. It was the shouting of joy when the roaming 10,000 Greeks saw Euxeinos Pontos (the Black Sea) from Mount Theches (Θήχης) in Armenia after participating in Cyrus the Younger's failed march against Persian Empire in the year 401 BC.

Thánatos oudèn diaphérei tou zên.
"Death is no different than life."
Thales' philosophical view to the eternal philosophical question about life and death.

Ιι
(h)i

Iatré, therápeuson seautón.
"Physician, take care of yourself!"
"Medice cura te ipsum."
An injunction urging physicians to care for and heal themselves first before dealing with patients. It was made famous in the Latin translation of the Bible, the Vulgate. The proverb was quoted by Jesus, recorded in the Gospel of Luke chapter 4:23. Luke the Evangelist was a physician.

Iēsoûs Khristòs Theoû Hyiòs Sōtḗr
"Jesus Christ, Son of God, Saviour." As an acronym: ΙΧΘΥΣ (Ichthys) — "fish".

Iskhýs mou hē agápē toû laoû.
"The people's love [is] my strength.“
Motto of the Royal House of Glücksburg.

Ikhthỳs ek tês kephalês ózein árkhetai.
"A fish starts to stink from the head."
Greek equivalent of the English phrase "A fish rots from the head down"; attested in fifteenth century CE Paroemiae of Michael Apostolius Paroemiographus.

Κκ
k, c

Kaì sỳ téknon?
"You too, child?" or "You too, young man?"
On March 15, 44 BC, Julius Caesar was attacked by a group of senators, including Marcus Junius Brutus, a senator and Caesar's adopted son. Suetonius (in De Vita Caesarum, LXXXII) reported that some people thought that, when Caesar saw Brutus, he spoke those words and resigned himself to his fate. Among English speakers, much better known are the Latin words Et tu, Brute?, which William Shakespeare gave to Caesar in his play, Julius Caesar (act 3, scene 1,85). This means simply "You too, Brutus?"

Kakodaimonistai
"Worshippers of the evil demon"
The name of a dining club in ancient Athens ridiculing Athenian tradition and the gods.

Kakoû kórakos kakòn ōón.
"From a bad crow, a bad egg"
I.e. like father, like son.

Kakòs anḕr makróbios
"A bad man lives long"

Kallístēi
"For the prettiest one", "To the most beautiful"
From the myth of the Golden Apple of Discord.

Kátthane, Diagóra, ou kaì es Ólympon anabḗsē.
"Die, Diagoras — you will certainly not ascend Olympus."
A Spartan spectator to Diagoras of Rhodes, a former Olympic champion himself, during the 79th Olympiad, when his two sons became Olympic champions and carried him around the stadium on their shoulders. 

Koinà tà fílōn
"The things of friends are common"
The proverb is mentioned in the Republic of Plato (424A and 449C) as a principle to be applied to marriage and procreation.

Krêtes aeì pseûstai
"Cretans always lie" — One of the earliest logical paradoxes attributed to Epimenides of Knossos known as the Epimenides paradox.  As Epimenides is a Cretan himself, it leads to the conclusion that the above statement is not true, hence the paradox.

ktêma es aeí
"possession for eternity" (Thucydides, History of the Peloponnesian War 1.22; "κτῆμά τε ἐς αἰεὶ [ktêma te es aieí]" in the original).

Kýrie eléēson
"Lord have mercy" — a very common phrase in Greek Orthodox liturgies, and also used in Greek in the Roman Catholic Mass.

Λλ
l

Láthe biṓsas
"Live hidden"
An Epicurean phrase, because of his belief that politics troubles men and doesn't allow them to reach inner peace. So Epicurus suggested that everybody should live "Hidden" far from cities, not even considering a political career. Cicero criticized this idea because, as a stoic, he had a completely different opinion of politics, but the sentiment is echoed by Ovid's statement bene qui latuit bene vixit ("he has lived well who has stayed well hidden", Tristia 3.4.25). Plutarch elaborated in his essay Is the Saying "Live in Obscurity" Right? 1128c.

Légein tà legómena
Prodenda, quia prodita or Relata refero
"I tell as I was told" or "I report reports"
From Herodotus (7,152 etc.):

Egṑ dè opheílō légein tà legómena, peíthesthaí ge mèn ou pantápasi opheílō.

And I must tell what I am told, since I don't have to be persuaded completely.

Μμ
m

Mataiótes mataiotéton, tá pánta mataiótes.
"Vanity of vanities, and everything is vanity."

Métron áriston
"Moderation is best"
On occasions where neither too much nor too little is a good choice, as when eating or celebrating. Cleobulus, according to Diogenes Laërtius.

Mḕ moû toùs kúklous táratte.
"Do not disturb my circles."
The last words attributed to Archimedes (paraphrased from Valerius Maximus' Memorable Doings and Sayings). During the raid of Syracuse by the Romans, Archimedes was busy drawing mathematical circles. He was eventually attacked and killed by a Roman soldier as he was too engrossed in thought to obey the soldier’s orders.

Mḕ kheíron béltiston.
"The least bad [choice] is the best."
The lesser of two evils principle known from the Platonean times.

Mēdèn ágan.
"Nothing in excess"
Inscription from the temple of Apollo at Delphi

Mêlon tês Éridos.
"Apple of Discord"
goddess Eris tossed the Apple of Discord "to the fairest". Paris was the judge of the prettiest one.

Mēkéti hydropótei, all' oínōi olígōi khrô dià tòn stómakhon kaì tàs pyknás sou astheneías.
Stop drinking only water, but take a little wine for your stomach and your frequent illnesses.
From I Timothy 5:23

Molṑn labé!
"Come take [them]!"
King Leonidas of Sparta, in response to King Xerxes of Persia's demand that the Greek army lay down their arms before the Battle of Thermopylae.

Mystḗrion tês písteōs
"Mystery of faith", from I Timothy 3:9.
Latinized as Mysterium Fidei is a Christian theological term.

Νν 
n

Naì naí, où oú;
"Yes yes, no no;"
Gospel of Matthew, Chapter 5
“33 Again, you have heard that it was said to the people long ago, ‘Do not break your oath, but keep the oaths you have made to the Lord.’ 34 But I tell you, Do not swear at all: either by heaven, for it is God’s throne; 35 or by the earth, for it is his footstool; or by Jerusalem, for it is the city of the Great King. 36 And do not swear by your head, for you cannot make even one hair white or black. 37 Simply let your ‘Yes’ be ‘Yes,’ and your ‘No,’ ‘No’; anything beyond this comes from the evil one."

Nenikḗkamen.
"We have won."

Nípson anomḗmata mḕ mónan ópsin
"Wash the sins not only the face"
A palindromic inscription attributed to Gregory of Nazianzus, inscribed in Hagia Sophia and on many church fonts. In the Greek alphabet, the /ps/ sound is rendered by the single letter ψ (psi).

Ξξ 
x

Xénos ṑn akoloúthei toîs epikhōríois nómois.
"As a foreigner, follow the laws of that country."
Loosely, "Do in Rome as Rome does." Quotation from the works of Menander.

Xýlinon teîkhos
"Wooden defensive wall"
The "walls" of ships during the Persian Wars.

Οο
(h)o

Oînops póntos
"Wine dark sea"
A common Homeric epithet of the sea, on which many articles have been written. (Further: Sea in culture)

 (ΟΕΔ)
Hóper édei deîxai. (abbreviated as OED)
"Quod erat demonstrandum"
"what was required to be proved"
Used by early mathematicians including Euclid (Elements, 1.4), Aristotle (APo.90b34), and Archimedes, written at the end of a mathematical proof or philosophical argument, to signify the proof as complete. Later it was latinized as "QED" or the Halmos tombstone box symbol.

Ho sôizōn heautòn sōthētō. 
"he who saves himself may be saved"
Used in cases of destruction or calamity, such as an unorderly evacuation. Each one is responsible for himself and is not to wait for any help.

Ou phrontìs Hippokleídēi.
"Hippocleides doesn't care."
From a story in Herodotus (6.129), in which Hippocleides loses the chance to marry Cleisthenes' daughter after getting drunk and dancing on his head. Herodotus says the phrase was a common expression in his own day.

Ouk àn labois parà toû mē ekhontos.
"You can’t get blood out of a stone." (Literally, "You can't take from one who doesn't have.")
Menippus to Charon when the latter asked Menippus to give him an obol to convey him across the river to the underworld.

Oûtis emoí g' ónoma.
"My name is Nobody".
Odysseus to Polyphemus when asked what his name was. (Homer, Odyssey, ix, 366).

Ππ
p

Panta rhei
"All is flux; everything flows" – This phrase was either not spoken by Heraclitus or did not survive as a quotation of his. This famous aphorism used to characterize Heraclitus' thought comes from Simplicius, a Neoplatonist, and from Plato's Cratylus. The word rhei (cf. rheology) is the Greek word for "to stream"; according to Plato's Cratylus, it is related to the etymology of Rhea.

Pántote zeteῖn tḕn alētheian
"ever seeking the truth" — Diogenes Laërtius, Lives of Eminent Philosophers — a characteristic of Pyrrhonism. An abbreviated form,  ("seek the truth").

Papaí, Mardónie, koíous ep' ándras ḗgages makhēsoménous hēméas, hoì ou perì khrēmátōn tòn agôna poieûntai allà perì aretês.
"Good heavens! Mardonius, what kind of men have you brought us to fight against? Men who do not compete for possessions, but for honour."
Spontaneous response of Tigranes, a Persian general while Xerxes was interrogating some Arcadians after the Battle of Thermopylae. Xerxes asked why there were so few Greek men defending the Thermopylae. The answer was "All the other men are participating in the Olympic Games". And when asked "What is the prize for the winner?", "An olive-wreath" came the answer. — Herodotus, The Histories

páthei máthos
"(There is) learning in suffering/experience", or "Knowledge/knowing, or wisdom, or learning, through suffering".
 Aeschylus, Agamemnon, 177 
The variant πάθος μάθος means "suffering is learning/learning is suffering."

Pêma kakòs geítôn, hósson t' agathòs még' óneiar
"A bad neighbor is a calamity as much as a good one is a great advantage."

Pístis, elpís, agápē
"Faith, hope, (and) love." (1 Corinthians 13:13.)

Pólemos pántōn mèn patḗr esti
"War is the father of all" — Heraclitus
The complete text of this fragment by Heraclitus is:  (War is the father of all and the king of all; and some he has made gods and some men, some bond and some free).

Pýx, láx, dáx
"With fists, kicks, and bites"
 "with fists",  "with kicks",  "with bites"
Epigram describing how laypersons were chased away from the Eleusinian Mysteries.

Ρρ 
rh

Rhododáktylos Ēṓs
"Rosy-fingered Dawn."
This phrase occurs frequently in the Homeric poems referring to Eos, the Titanic goddess of the dawn. Eos opened the gates of heaven so that Helios could ride his chariot across the sky every day.

Σσ
s

Speûde bradéōs.
"Hasten slowly" (cf. Latin festina lente), "less haste, more speed".
According to Suetonius the phrase "σπεῦδε βραδέως, ἀσφαλὴς γάρ ἐστ᾽ ἀμείνων ἢ θρασὺς στρατηλάτης" was a favorite of Augustus as he often quoted it.

Sỳn Athēnâi kaì kheîra kinei.
"Along with Athena, move also your hand" — predecessor to the English "God helps those who help themselves."
Appears in Aesop's fable "The Shipwrecked Man" (Ἀνὴρ ναυαγός, Perry 30, Chambry 53).

Ττ
t

Tà mén aplanéa tōn astrōn kai tón halion ménein akinēton, tàn dé gân periphéresthai peri tón hálion.
"The fixed stars and the Sun remain unmoved, while the Earth revolves about the Sun" — Archimedes' description of  the heliocentric model in his work The Sand Reckoner, based on the work by Aristarchus of Samos.

Tà pánta rheî kaì oudèn ménei.
"Everything flows, nothing stands still."
Attributed to Heraclitus — Plato, in his dialogue Cratylus, recounts Heraclitus' saying:

Tà ónta iénai te pánta kaì ménein oudèn
"[That] things that exist move and nothing remains still", which he expands:

Pánta khōreî kaì oudèn ménei kaì dìs es tòn autòn potamòn ouk àn embaíēs
"All things move and nothing remains still, and you cannot step twice into the same stream".

Tád' estì Pelopónnēsos, ouk Iōnía.
"Here is Peloponnesus, not Ionia" — Inscription written on a pillar erected by Theseus on the Isthmus of Corinth facing toward the West, i.e. toward the Peloponnese.

Tád' oukhì Pelopónnēsos, all' Iōnía.
"Here is not Peloponnesus, but Ionia" — inscription as per above, but toward East, i.e. toward Attica.

"The roots of education are bitter, but the fruit is sweet." - Aristotle

Tí dýskolon? Tò heautòn gnônai.
"What is hard? To know thyself." — attributed (among other sages) to Thales, according to Pausanias

Ti estin ho mian ekhon phōnēn tetrapoun kai dipoun kai tripoun ginetai?
"What is that which has one voice and yet becomes four-footed and two-footed and three-footed?." — The famous riddle of the Sphinx. Oedipus solved the riddle correctly by answering: “Man: as an infant, he crawls on fours; as an adult, he walks on two legs and; in old age, he uses a walking stick”.

Tí eúkolon? Tò állōi hypotíthesthai.
"What is easy? To advise another." — Thales

Tí kainòn eiē tetheaménos? Géronta týrannon.
"What is the strangest thing to see? "An aged tyrant." — Thales

Tí koinótaton? Elpís. Kaì gàr hoîs állo mēdén, aútē paréstē.
"What is quite common? Hope. When all is gone, there is still hope. Literally: "Because even to those who have nothing else, it is still nearby." — Thales

Tí tákhiston? Noûs. Dià pantòs gàr trékhei.
"What is the fastest? The mind. It travels through everything." — Thales

Tí próteron gegónoi, nùx ē hēméra? núx, miâi hēmérai próteron.
"Which is older, day or night? "Night is the older, by one day." — Thales

Tò gàr hēdý, eàn polý, ou tí ge hēdý.
"A sweet thing tasted too often is no longer sweet."

Tò dìs examarteîn ouk andròs sophoû.
"To make the same mistake twice [is] not [a sign] of a wise man."

Tò peprōménon phygeîn adýnaton.
"It's impossible to escape from what is destined."

Υυ 
hy

Hyiòs monogenḗs
"Only-begotten son" From John 3:16 ουτως γαρ ηγαπησεν ο θεος τον κοσμον ωστε υἱὸν  αυτου τὸν μονογενῆ ἔδωκεν  "For God so loved the world that He gave His only begotten Son" and see John 1:14
Unigenitus (named for its Latin opening words Unigenitus dei filius, or "Only-begotten son of God") is an apostolic constitution in the form of a papal bull promulgated by Pope Clement XI in 1713.

Hýsteron próteron
"The latter one first"
Rhetorical device in which the most important action is placed first, even though it happens after the other action. The standard example comes from the Aeneid of Virgil (2.353):
Moriamur, et in media arma ruamus "Let us die, and charge into the thick of the fight".

Φφ 

Phoinikḗïa grámmata
"Phoenician letters"
The Phoenician prince Cadmus was generally accredited by Greeks such as Herodotus with the introduction of the Phoenician alphabet several centuries before the Trojan war, circa 2000 BC.

Phroneîn gàr hoi takheîs ouk asphaleîs
"Those who make quick decisions are not safe."

Χχ

Khalepà tà kalá
"The good/beautiful things [are] difficult [to attain]."
"Naught without labor."
"[What is] good/beautiful [is] troublesome."
Cf. Plato, Republic 4, 435c; Hippias Major, 304e

Ψψ
ps

ψυχῆς ἰατρεῖον
Psykhês iatreîon.
"Hospital of the soul"
Refers to the Library of Alexandria, also known as the Great Library in Alexandria, Egypt, which was once the largest library in the world.
The phrase is used in reverse as ἰατρεῖον ψυχῆς as a motto for Carolina Rediviva, a university library in Uppsala, and is echoed in the motto of the American Philological Association, "ψυχῆς ἰατρὸς τὰ γράμματα" ("literature is the soul's physician"). The phrase "ΨΥΧΗΣ ΙΑΤΡΕΙΟΝ" is above the entrance door of the Abbey library of Saint Gall.

Ωω 
(h)ō

Ô xeîn’, angéllein Lakedaimoníois hóti têide / keímetha toîs keínōn rhḗmasi peithómenoi.
"Stranger, tell the Spartans that here we lie, obedient to their laws."
Epitaph, a single elegiac couplet by Simonides on the dead of Thermopylae.
Translated by Cicero in his Tusculan Disputations (1.42.101) as «Dic, hospes, Spartae nos te hic vidisse iacentis / dum sanctis patriae legibus obsequimur» (often quoted with the form iacentes).

See also
 Delphic maxims
 Epithets in Homer
 English words of Greek origin
 Greek language
 List of Latin phrases

Notes

External links
 
 Quotations of the Seven Sages of Ancient Greece 

Greek Phrases, List of
 
Greek Phrases, List of